The Magistrates' Courts is a building on Dale Street, Liverpool used for magistrates' court hearings until 2015. It is a Grade II listed building designed by John Grey Weightman built between 1857 and 1859. Until the 1970s buildings in Great Crosshall Street were used for juvenile court hearings until a new purpose-built complex was opened accessible from Hatton Garden. There were also courtrooms in Victoria Street which were mostly used for hearing road traffic cases. They were operated by His Majesty's Courts Service.

In 2007 it was announced that the Dale Street building will close to be replaced by a new purpose-built set of courts.  Approval for the project was given, with a budget of £35m, for a new complex to be built in the city centre, comprising 14 adult courtrooms, with a projected completion date of 2012.

The courts were instead relocated to the Queen Elizabeth II Law Courts in June 2015.

References

External links

Grade II listed buildings in Liverpool
Court buildings in Liverpool
Magistrates' courts in England and Wales
Unused buildings in Liverpool
1859 establishments in England